The St. Clement of Ohrid University of Bitola is a public university in North Macedonia. Headquartered in Bitola, it also has faculties in Prilep, Ohrid, Veles, Kichevo and Skopje. It was founded on 25 April 1979, but the name of St. Clement of Ohrid was not given until late 1994. As of 2018–19 school year, a total of 4,139 students are enrolled at the university.

The act of the formal establishment of the university of Bitola was on 25 April 1979. The 1970's was a decade of exponential rise in number of higher education institutions in the former Yugoslavia when alongside Bitola many other universities across the country were opened.

Organization
A Self-Managing Agreement for joining into the University of Bitola was signed by six higher education institutions and two research institutes, namely:
 Faculty of Economics – Prilep
 Faculty of Law – Bitola
 Faculty of Technical Sciences – Bitola
 Faculty of Tourism and Catering – Ohrid
 Higher School of Agriculture - Bitola
 Academy of Pedagogy- Bitola
 Tobacco Institute – Prilep
 Institute of Hydro-biology- Ohrid

The following institutions have since joined the university:
 Institute for Old Slav Culture – Prilep (1985)
 National and University Library "St.Kliment Ohridski" – Biota (1980)
 Student Center "Koch Racin" – Bitola (1981)
 Higher Medical School – Bitola (1988)
 Police Academy – Skopje (2004)

The international character of UKLO is confirmed by the participation in international programs and associations among which the most significant is the membership in EUA and BUA. St. Clement of Ohrid University is also a holder of the Erasmus+ Charter.

Study fields 
Natural Sciences
 Computer & information sciences

Engineering & Technology
 Transport engineering
 Electrical, electronic and information engineering
 Communication engineering and systems
 Applied engineering (environmental protection)
 Mechanical Engineering
 Mechatronics
 Graphic Engineering

Medical & Health Sciences
 Nursing
 Nutrition (gastronomy)
 Dietetics
 Health care (midwifery, physiotherapy, radiology, medical laboratory)
 Forensic science

Agricultural Sciences
 Agricultural biotechnology and food biotechnology
 Animal products processing
 Agronomy, plant breeding and plant protection
 Veterinary science

Social Sciences
 Economics and Business (finances, management, banking, accounting, auditing, marketing, insurance)
 Educational sciences
 Law
 Tourism and hospitality
 Security
 Political sciences
 Organization science and management

Humanities
 Languages
 Literature

Members
12 higher education institutions (10 faculties, 1 higher school, 1 scientific institute)

4 accompanying units:
 Faculty of Economics – Prilep
 Faculty of Technical Sciences – Bitola
 Faculty of Biotechnical Sciences
 Faculty of Education – Bitola
 Faculty of Veterinary Medicine – Bitola
 Faculty of Information and Communication Technologies – Bitola
 Faculty of Tourism and Hospitality – Ohrid
 Faculty of Security – Skopje
 Faculty of Law – Kichevo
 Faculty of Technology and Technical Sciences – Veles
 Higher Medical School – Bitola
 Faculty of Information and Communication Technologies – Bitola
 Tobacco institute – Prilep

Accompanying units
 Hydro-biological institute – Ohrid
 Institute for Ancient Slav literature
 National Institution University Library "St.Kliment Ohridski"
 Students’ residence "Kocho Racin" – Bitola

International research journal – Horizons 
Horizons is an international research journal of St. Clement of Ohrid University published in two series depending on the research areas: Series A in the area of social sciences and humanities, and Series B in the area of natural sciences and mathematics, engineering and technology, biotechnology, medicine and health sciences. The journal is EBSCO classified.

See also
 Balkan Universities Network
 List of universities in the Republic of North Macedonia
 List of colleges and universities
 Bitola

References

External links 
 

Universities in North Macedonia
Educational institutions established in 1979
1979 establishments in the Socialist Republic of Macedonia
Education in Bitola
Buildings and structures in Bitola